Kirahandige Dushan Vimukthi Wimalasekera (born 9 December 1991) is a Sri Lankan cricketer. He made his first-class debut for Sri Lanka Air Force Sports Club in the 2013–14 Premier Trophy on 17 January 2014. He was the leading run-scorer for Sri Lanka Army Sports Club in the 2018–19 Premier League Tournament, with 889 runs in ten matches. He was also the team's leading wicket-taker in the tournament, with 39 dismissals.

References

External links
 

1991 births
Living people
Sri Lankan cricketers
Badureliya Sports Club cricketers
Panadura Sports Club cricketers
Sri Lanka Air Force Sports Club cricketers
Sri Lanka Army Sports Club cricketers
People from Western Province, Sri Lanka
People from Panadura